¡Ay, caramba! is a Spanish language exclamation used to denote surprise.

Caramba may also refer to:

Music 
Caramba, an orchestral overture by William Blezard
El caramba: canción andaluza, composition for voice and piano or guitar by Ramon Carnicer
Caramba (band), a Swedish music group or their 1981 self-titled album

Albums
Caramba! (Lee Morgan album), or the title track, "Caramba", 1968
Caramba, by Carmen González, or the title track, 2000
Caramba, a series of albums by Horst Wende, also known as Roberto Delgado
¡Ay Caramba! (album), by Ska Cubano, 2006

Songs
Hey Caramba, by Compay Segundo
"Caramba!... Galileu da Galileia" by Jorge Ben from Ben (Jorge Ben album), 1972
"Caramba! It's the Samba", by Peggy Lee
"Caramba", by The Champs, 1959

Other uses
La Caramba, stage name of flamenco singer and dancer Maria Antonia Fernandez (1751–1787)
FC Caramba Riga, a predecessor of the Riga FC, football club

See also
 Karamba (disambiguation)